Henk Vriens (born 26 October 1943) is a Dutch footballer. He played in one match for the Netherlands national football team in 1963.

References

External links
 

1943 births
Living people
Dutch footballers
Netherlands international footballers
Place of birth missing (living people)
Association footballers not categorized by position